Zmiivka may refer to the following places in Ukraine:

Zmiivka, village in Beryslav Raion, Kherson Oblast
Zmiivka, village in Svatove Raion, Luhansk Oblast